Sara Kolarovska (born 19 August 1999) is a Macedonian footballer who plays as a midfielder for Women's Championship club ŽFK Dragon 2014 and the North Macedonia women's national team.

Club career
Kolarovska has played for Dragon in North Macedonia.

International career
Kolarovska capped for North Macedonia at senior level during the UEFA Women's Euro 2022 qualifying.

References

1999 births
Living people
Macedonian women's footballers
Women's association football midfielders
North Macedonia women's international footballers
ŽFK Dragon 2014 players